The Urban Bantu Councils Act, Act No 79 of 1961, formed part of the apartheid system of racial segregation in South Africa. It replaced the Advisory Boards created earlier by the Natives Urban Areas Act of 1923, and permitted democratic election of new municipal councils with African chairmen which were assigned some administrative duties.

References

Apartheid laws in South Africa
1961 in South African law